The Storm Daughter is a lost 1924 American silent drama film directed by George Archainbaud and starring Priscilla Dean. It was produced and distributed by Universal Pictures. Some sources claim Edward J. Le Saint and/or Colin Campbell as a co-director.

Plot
As described in a film magazine review, a fishing boat in which Kate Masterson is sailing is run down by a schooner commanded by skipper Brute Morgan, a man with a terrible reputation. The young woman is rescued, forced to work, and ill-used by Morgan, who hates all members of her sex. In a mutiny the brutal but valorous skipper battles desperately against big odds, but is overpowered and put in irons. A violent storm breaks out and the captain is released to reassume command. The vessel sinks. Morgan and the young woman reach a desolate island. However, after all of these events, Morgan is a changed man and in love with Kate. She agrees to marry him.

Cast

Preservation
The Storm Daughter is lost with a fragment existing at BFI National Archive.

References

External links

Still plate (archived)
Film still plate (archived)

1924 films
American silent feature films
Lost American films
Universal Pictures films
Films directed by George Archainbaud
American black-and-white films
1920s American films